Rest on Your Shoulder (Chinese: 肩上蝶) is a 2011 Chinese fantasy film created by Ning Bei Dao Cao Jia Cou Television Planning Co.LTD and released by EDKO Film Ltd. It was directed by Zhang Zhiliang. The film stars Gwei Lun-mei, Chen Kun, Gigi Leung and Jiang Yiyan.

Plot
The film begins with a famous doctor, Yan Guo, becoming extremely sick during the course of his studies. To save his life, his girlfriend Baobao makes an agreement with a mysterious creature; in exchange for the health of Yan Guo, she agrees to be turned into a butterfly for three years.

Yan Guo finally recovers from his illness and wakes up. He is confused and hurt by Baobao's disappearance, and in her absence other women begin trying to attract his attention. Meanwhile, Baobao begins living her life as a butterfly, but finds that the other insects will not associate with her, finding her too human.

Soon, a dangerous and infectious disease begins spreading on the island. Both Yan Guo and Baobao try their best during this time to help those around them. When the three years have passed, will they have a happy ending?

Cast
 Chen Kun as Yan Guo
 Gwei Lun-mei as Bai Lan
 Jiang Yiyan as Baobao
 Gigi Leung as Yang Lin

References

http://data.ent.163.com/movie/product/000BGIfb.html
http://data.ent.sina.com.cn/movie/10787.html
http://app.ent.ifeng.com/movie/detail/4108

External links
 
http://film.ifensi.com/film_jiansd.html
http://v.youku.com/v_show/id_XMTg5MjQyODYw.html
http://www.mtime.com/movie/119277/

2011 films
2010s Mandarin-language films
2010s romantic fantasy films
Chinese romantic fantasy films